Calophyllum laticostatum is a species of flowering plant in the Calophyllaceae family. It is found in Papua New Guinea and possibly the Philippines.

References

Flora of Papua New Guinea
Flora of the Philippines
Data deficient plants
laticostatum
Taxonomy articles created by Polbot